The logothetēs tōn sekretōn was an official supervising all the sekreta (fiscal departments) of the Byzantine Empire during the Komnenian period. In the early 13th century, his office evolved into the megas logothetes.

History and functions

The post was first established by Emperor Alexios I Komnenos (r. 1081–1118), in an attempt to improve the coordination of the various departments (sekreta). The fiscal departments in particular were further grouped under two other officials: the two principal treasury departments, the genikon and eidikon, were put under the megas logariastēs tōn sekretōn ("grand accountant of the sekreta"), while the megas logariastēs tōn euagōn sekretōn oversaw the "pious bureaux" (euagē sekreta), i.e. imperial estates and religious foundations. In the late 12th century, the logothetēs tōn sekretōn had become the megas logothetēs, an office which survived until the Fall of Constantinople in May 1453.

References

Sources

Byzantine administrative offices